Seyntex is a Belgian textile manufacturing company. The company's headquarters are in Tielt, Belgium.

History
The company was founded in Oostrozebeke, Belgium, in 1908 by Arthur Seynaeve as a flax-weaving mill. The company expanded into weaving, knitting, dyeing, finishing, coating, textile printing, and manufacturing. The company is led by the fourth generation, with production facilities across the world. The company's main focus is on high-tech textiles, as well as bulletproof and CBRN defense products.

John Field
John Field is a Seyntex trademark. It originally specialized in horseback riding and shooting (hunting) apparel. It moved to shooting and rain apparel.  Each type of garment is given special properties, such as magnets for closing pockets, high visibility, and mosquito-repellent properties.

Sources
 Seyntex
 Belgian king visits Seyntex (Dutch)
 Fire destroys Seyntex factory (Dutch)

Clothing companies of Belgium
Companies based in West Flanders